Schweinfurt Stadt (German for Schweinfurt Town) is a railway station in the Lower Franconian city of Schweinfurt, Germany. It is situated east of the old town, on the Bamberg to Rottendorf line.

References

Railway stations in Bavaria
Stadt station